José Eduardo Esidio (born November 17, 1970) in São Paulo) is a Brazilian footballer.

He was the South American Top scorer in the year 2000 with 37 goals in 38 matches when playing for one of Peru's top teams, Universitario de Deportes. He is also known for being the first professional footballer in the world to be diagnosed as HIV positive in 1998.  After some controversy in Peru, he continued to play professionally.  He also played for União São João, Botafogo de Ribeirão Preto, Juventus de São Paulo, Marília, Paulista and Uberlândia, among other teams.

External links
 Fútbol Peruano.com

1970 births
Living people
Brazilian footballers
Brazilian expatriate footballers
Peruvian Primera División players
União São João Esporte Clube players
Botafogo Futebol Clube (SP) players
Clube Atlético Juventus players
Marília Atlético Clube players
Paulista Futebol Clube players
Uberlândia Esporte Clube players
Club Universitario de Deportes footballers
Expatriate footballers in Peru
People with HIV/AIDS
Association football forwards
Footballers from São Paulo